SS California may refer to the following ships:
 , a United States paddle wheel mail steamer built in 1848 for the Pacific Mail Steamship Company which was wrecked near Pacasmayo, Peru in 1895
 , a UK passenger and cargo ship built 1872 for the Anchor Line and scrapped in 1904
 , sailing ship built by Harland and Wolff in 1890 for North Western Shipping
 , a UK passenger ship built in 1902 for the Pacific Steam Navigation Company and torpedoed on 17 October 1917
 , a UK passenger ship built in 1907 and torpedoed on 7 February 1917
 , a US cargo ship built in 1920 and later renamed California
 , an ocean liner built in Scotland in 1920 and later renamed California by her Italian owners
 , a US oil tanker built in 1921, renamed SS Agwismith and then renamed SS California
 , a UK ocean liner built in 1923 and sunk by German air attack in 1943
 , a US ocean liner built in 1928 for the Panama Pacific Line; renamed Uruguay in 1938 and scrapped in 1964

See also
 
 
 

Ship names